The 1998 FIFA World Cup was the 16th FIFA World Cup, a quadrennial football tournament contested by the senior men's teams of the national associations affiliated to FIFA (the International Federation of Association Football). The tournament was played in France from 10 June to 12 July 1998 and featured 32 teams divided into eight groups of four. Each team was required to submit a squad of 22 players – numbered sequentially from 1 to 22 – from whom they would select their teams for each match at the tournament, with the final squads to be submitted by 1 June 1998. In total, 704 players were selected for the tournament.

It featured players born in four different decades, the 1950s, the 1960s, the 1970s and the 1980s. The only other times this has happened at a World Cup was in the 1958, 1970 and 1990 editions.

Players' ages as of 10 June 1998, the tournament's opening day.

Group A

Brazil

Head coach: Mário Zagallo

Morocco
Head coach:  Henri Michel

Norway

Head coach: Egil Olsen

Scotland

Head coach: Craig Brown

Group B

Austria

Head coach: Herbert Prohaska

Cameroon

Head coach:  Claude Le Roy

Chile

Head coach:  Nelson Acosta

Italy

Head coach: Cesare Maldini

Group C

Denmark

Head coach:  Bo Johansson

France

Head coach: Aimé Jacquet

Saudi Arabia

Head coach:  Carlos Alberto Parreira (fired after two matches, replaced by Mohammed Al-Kharashy for the final match)

South Africa

Head coach:  Philippe Troussier

Andre Arendse (#22) was injured before the start of the tournament. His replacement, Paul Evans, was also injured shortly after arriving as a replacement. Simon Gopane was then called up, and sat on the bench for the last two matches.

Group D

Bulgaria

Head coach: Hristo Bonev

Nigeria

Head coach:  Bora Milutinović

Paraguay

Head coach:  Paulo César Carpegiani

Spain

Head coach: Javier Clemente

Group E

Belgium

Head coach: Georges Leekens

Mexico

Head coach: Manuel Lapuente

Netherlands

Head coach: Guus Hiddink

South Korea
Head coach:  Cha Bum-kun (fired after two matches, replaced by  Kim Pyung-seok for the final match)

Group F

Germany

Head coach: Berti Vogts

Note: Kirsten and Marschall also earned additional caps for East Germany (49 and 4, respectively).

Iran
Head coach: Jalal Talebi

United States

Head coach: Steve Sampson

FR Yugoslavia

Head coach: Slobodan Santrač

Group G

Colombia

Head coach: Hernán Darío Gómez

England

Head coach: Glenn Hoddle

Romania

Head coach: Anghel Iordănescu

Tunisia

Head coach:  Henryk Kasperczak (fired after two matches, replaced by Ali Selmi for the final match)

Group H

Argentina

Head coach: Daniel Passarella

Croatia
Head coach: Miroslav Blažević

Jamaica
Head coach:  Renê Simões

Japan

Head coach: Takeshi Okada

Player representation by league

The English, Spanish, Japanese and Saudi Arabian squads were made up entirely of players from the respective countries' domestic leagues. The Nigeria squad was made up entirely of players employed by foreign clubs. Only three teams, Japan, Mexico, and Saudi Arabia, had no players from European clubs.

Although Turkey and Portugal failed to qualify for the finals, their domestic leagues were represented by 18 and 9 players, respectively. Altogether, there were 38 national leagues who had players in the tournament.

References

 Planet World Cup website
 weltfussball.de 

Squads
FIFA World Cup squads